BJN may refer to: 

 Bagh-e-Jahan nama palace, an Afghan palace built by Amir Abdur Rahman
 Banjar language, an Indonesian agglutinative language, ISO 639-3 code
 British Journal of Nutrition, a peer-review scientific journal focusing on nutrition
 Beijing South railway station, China Railway pinyin code BJN